Benetone Hillin Entertainment is an international production company with offices in Los Angeles, USA, and Bangkok, Thailand. The two companies, Thailand's largest production service company Benetone Films and US production company Hillin Entertainment had been building a relationship, and in 2011, the two combined to create Benetone Hillin Entertainment.

About the company 
In 2011, Benetone Films joined hands with Daemon Hillin, a producer based in Los Angeles, establishing Benetone Hillin Entertainment with an aim to take advantage of the US and Asian filming capabilities to create commercial films for international audiences. The company has produced four films of various genres, which includes two projects directed by Cameron Romero, son of horror icon George Romero, titled Radical (2011), Auteur (2014), A Stranger in Paradise (2013) that had a national theatrical release in the U.S. on February 14, 2014 by Freestyle Digital Media, and the recently concluded production of Pernicious, a supernatural horror film, directed by James Cullen Bressack; slated for release in May/June 2015.

On January 14, 2014, Benetone Hillin Entertainment announced signing up of Gordon Bressack, a three-time, Emmy Award-winning writer of such animated shows as Pinky & The Brain and Animaniacs, for a live-action feature film, Oliver Storm and the Curse of Sinbad's Treasure, slated for the 2015 release. The film will be shot completely in Thailand, and will be written by Gordon Bressack and his son, James Cullen Bressack.

Filmography (with years released)

 2012: Paramithiasmenes: Hollywood Dream
 2013: A Stranger in Paradise
 2014: Auteur
 2014: Unicorn Zombie Apocalyps 
 2014: Pernicious
 2015: The Runaway
 2015: By the Rivers of Babylon
 2015: Ghost Hous
 2015: Oliver Storm and the Curse of Sinbad's Treasure
 2016: Miskatonic
 2016: Table 18

References

External links
 Benetone Hillin Entertainment at the Internet Movie Database
 

Film production companies of the United States
Film production companies of Thailand